Maria Rużycka (25 August 1905 – 14 July 1961) was a Polish painter. Her work was part of the painting event in the art competition at the 1936 Summer Olympics.

References

1905 births
1961 deaths
20th-century Polish painters
Polish women painters
Olympic competitors in art competitions
Artists from Lviv
20th-century Polish women